The FIBA EuroCup Challenge was the 4th-tier level (however, it was a secondary level competition during the inaugural 2002–03 season), transnational professional continental club basketball competition in Europe. It was run and organized by FIBA Europe. The league was founded in 2002, as an attempt by FIBA to revive the old FIBA European Champions Cup, and it ultimately ceased in 2007. Each season's finalists were promoted to the next season's more prestigious 3rd-tier level competition, the FIBA EuroChallenge.

History
The competition was played during the 2002–03 to 2006–07 seasons. It was variously known as the FIBA Europe Champions Cup (2002–03), the FIBA Europe Cup (2003–05), and the FIBA EuroCup Challenge (2005–07).

Names of the competition

 FIBA Europe Champions Cup: (2002–2003)
 FIBA Europe Cup: (2003–2005)
 FIBA EuroCup Challenge: (2005–2007)

The Finals

Finals MVP

Titles by club

Winning rosters
FIBA Europe Champions Cup:
 2002–03  Aris
Willie Solomon, Ryan Stack, Ivan Grgat, Fedor Likholitov, Prodromos Nikolaidis, Ioannis Lappas, Ioannis Gagaloudis, Dimitar Angelov, Miroslav Raičević, Dimitrios Charitopoulos, Nikos Orfanos, Kostas Kakaroudis, Dimitris Merachtsakis (Head Coach: Vangelis Alexandris)

FIBA Europe Cup:
 2003–04  Mitteldeutscher
Wendell Alexis, Manuchar Markoishvili, Paul Burke, Marijonas Petravičius, Misan Nikagbatse, Sebastian Machowski, Stephen Arigbabu, Jonas Elvikis, Per Ringstrom, Chauncey Leslie, Peter Fehse, Paul Bayer, Michael Krikemans (Head Coach: Henrik Dettmann)
 2004–05  Asesoft Ploiești
Cătălin Burlacu, Ivan Krasic, Nikola Bulatović, Vladimir Kuzmanović, Paul Helcioiu, Marko Rakočević, Rares Apostol, Antonio Alexe, Levente Szijarto, Predrag Materić, Nicolae Toader, Marko Peković, Adrian Blidaru, Saša Ocokoljić (Head Coach: Mladjen Jojic)

FIBA EuroCup Challenge:
 2005–06  Ural Great Perm
Derrick Alston, Terrell Lyday, Vasily Karasev, Jurica Golemac, Jasmin Hukić, Andre Hutson, Andrei Trushkin, Egor Vyaltsev, Vadim Panin, Evgeni Kolesnikov, Aleksandr Dedushkin, Arseni Kuchinsky, Vyacheslav Shushakov, Artem Kuzyakin (Head Coach: Sharon Drucker)
 2006–07  CSK VVS Samara
Nikita Shabalkin, Omar Cook, Georgios Diamantopoulos, Kelvin Gibbs, Evgeni Voronov, Pavel Agapov, Gennadi Zelenskiy, Yaroslav Strelkin, Oleg Baranov, Pavel Ulyanko, Taras Osipov, Anton Glazunov, Alexei Kiryanov, Valeri Likhodey (Head Coach: Valeri Tikhonenko)

External links
FIBA EuroCup Challenge Homepage
linguaspor

 
International club basketball competitions
Defunct basketball cup competitions in Europe
2002 establishments in Europe
2007 disestablishments in Europe
Recurring sporting events established in 2002
Recurring sporting events disestablished in 2007